Kentropyx is a genus of whiptail lizards in the family Teiidae. The genus is endemic to South America including Trinidad and Barbados.

Species
There are nine valid species in this genus (listed alphabetically by specific name).
Kentropyx altamazonica (Cope, 1876) – Cocha whiptail
Kentropyx borckiana (W. Peters, 1869) – Guyana kentropyx
Kentropyx calcarata Spix, 1825 – striped forest whiptail
Kentropyx lagartija Gallardo, 1962 – Tucuman whiptail
Kentropyx paulensis (Boettger, 1893) – Boettger's kentropyx
Kentropyx pelviceps (Cope, 1868) – forest whiptail
Kentropyx striata (Daudin, 1802) – Suriname striped whiptail
Kentropyx vanzoi Gallagher & Dixon, 1980 – Gallagher's kentropyx
Kentropyx viridistriga (Boulenger, 1894) – green kentropyx

Nota bene: A binomial authority in parentheses indicates that the species was originally described in a genus other than Kentropyx.

References

Further reading
Boulenger GA (1885). Catalogue of the Lizards in the British Museum (Natural History). Second Edition. Volume II ... Teiidæ ... London: Trustees of the British Museum (Natural History). (Taylor and Francis, printers). xiii + 497 pp. + Plates I-XXIV. (Genus "Centropyx [sic]", p. 339).
Spix JB (1825). Animalia nova sive species nova lacertarum, quas in itinere per Brasiliam annis MDCCCXVII – MDCCCXX jussu et auspicius Maximiliani Josephi I. Bavariae Regis. Munich: F.S. Hübschmann. iv + 26 pp. + Plates I- XXVIII. (Kentropyx, new genus, p. 21). (in Latin).

 
Lizard genera
Taxa named by Johann Baptist von Spix